Bill Gibson (born September 8, 1955) is an American music producer.

He is president of Northwest Music and Recording and has spent the last 30+ years writing, recording, producing, and teaching music. He is the author of books and videos about audio recording and live sound; his writings contain simple straightforward explanations of audio concepts and applications. Gibson attended Green River College, Western Washington University, and The Evergreen State College and received his Bachelor of Arts degree from Evergreen in Composition and Arranging. From 1978–1981 he was an instructor at Green River College in Auburn, Washington. He approaches technical considerations from a musical vantage point, which tends to make his explanations of sound and audio concepts easy-to-understand for musicians.

Along with his performing and sound operating experience around the country, performing everything from jazz to pop in large and small venues, and as an accomplished musician, Bill also has a vast catalog of albums that he has produced and/or engineered in studios between Seattle, Los Angeles, and Nashville.

Gibson started playing drums and guitar when he was nine years old. He performed in various bands, including The Dukes, Dick and the Dutchmasters, The Sons of Liberty, Strawberry Jam, Midnight Magic, Collage, Rival, Kevin Katz, and Larry Collins.

In addition to being an instructor for Berklee Online and acting as technical director or performer for various groups, Gibson:
 is author of a 3-book series with Quincy Jones, in which Quincy shares the insights and knowledge he has gained about producing, film scoring, and writing music. The first offering in the series, Q on Producing, released at AES in San Francisco (11-4-2010)
 is an active music producer for acts including  11 albums for The Coats (On Christmas Time, Last a Lifetime, The Caroler, The Boys Are Back, and 7 more), 2 album for Jamie Dieveney (Beautiful You, Heaven's Not Too Far Away), Glimpse (See Without Sight),  Robbie Ott (In the Presence), and many more.
 was the liaison between the professional audio community and The Art Institute of Seattle from August 29, 2007 – December 31, 2010
 is chairman of the Producer & Engineer committee and on the Board of Governors for the Pacific Northwest Chapter of the National Academy of Recording Arts and Sciences
 is a member of the Audio Engineering Society, the Society of Broadcast Engineers, and a voting member of The Recording Academy
 is a National Trustee for The Recording Academy from 2012–2014

Musical productions include albums for Tony Moore, Keith Anderson and Larry Collins.

Bibliography
Book and video titles by Bill Gibson include:
 Killer Demos: Hot Tips and Cool Secrets for the Home Multitrack User - Self-produced, published, and distributed along with partner, Bob Sluys for Bill & Bob's Excellent Productions
 The Hit Sound Recording Course - Published and distributed by Alexander Publishing
 The AudioPro Home Recording Course - Volumes 1, 2 and 3 Published by MixBooks and distributed by Hal Leonard Publishing
 The 12-Volume InstantPro Sound Advice Series - Published by MixBooks and distributed by Hal Leoanard Publishing
 The 6-Volume S.M.A.R.T. Guide series - Published by Thomson Publishing's Course Technologies - distributed by Hal Leoanard Publishing
 The 6-Volume Hal Leonard Recording Method by Bill Gibson - Published and distributed by Hal Leonard Publishing
 The Ultimate Church Sound Operator's Handbook - Published and distributed by Hal Leonard Publishing
 The Ultimate Live Sound Operator's Handbook - Published and distributed by Hal Leonard Publishing
 The Quincy Jones Legacy Series: Book 1 - Q on Producing by Quincy Jones and Bill Gibson - Published and distributed by Hal Leonard Publishing
 The Bruce Swedien Recording Method by Bruce Swedien and Bill Gibson - Published and distributed by Hal Leonard Books.

References

External links
 

Living people
1955 births
American record producers
Western Washington University alumni
Evergreen State College alumni
Businesspeople from King County, Washington